The 13 Clocks is a fantasy tale written by James Thurber in 1950, while he was completing one of his other novels. It is written in a unique cadenced style, in which a mysterious prince must complete a seemingly impossible task to free a maiden from the clutches of an evil duke. It invokes many fairy tale motifs.

The story is noted for Thurber's constant, complex wordplay, and his use of an almost continuous internal meter, with occasional hidden rhymes — akin to blank verse, but with no line breaks to advertise the structure.  Other fantasy books by Thurber, such as Many Moons, The Wonderful O (published 1958), and particularly The White Deer, also contained hints of this unusual prose form, but here it becomes a universal feature of the text, to the point where it is possible to predict the word order for a given phrase (for example, "the Golux said" vs. "said the Golux") by looking at the pattern of emphasis in the preceding phrase.

By the time he wrote this book, Thurber was blind, so he could not draw cartoons for the book, as he had done with The White Deer five years earlier. He enlisted his friend Marc Simont to illustrate the original edition. The Golux is said to wear an "indescribable hat". Thurber made Simont describe all his illustrations, and was satisfied when Simont was unable to describe the hat. When it was reissued by Puffin Books, it was illustrated by Ronald Searle. The book has been reprinted by The New York Review Children's Collection, with original illustrations by Marc Simont and an introduction by Neil Gaiman.

Plot summary

The evil Duke of Coffin Castle lives with his good and beautiful niece, the princess Saralinda, in a castle so cold that all the clocks have frozen at ten minutes to five.  Several suitors have tried to court the Princess, but the Duke's policy is to test their eligibility by assigning them impossible tasks.  A few days before Saralinda's twenty-first birthday, Prince Zorn of Zorna arrives in the town disguised as a minstrel.  He falls in with an enigmatic guide known as the Golux.  Soon after, he is arrested for singing mocking songs about the Duke in public.

The Duke learns "Xingu"'s true identity, and decides to allow him to court Saralinda. The Duke assigns Zorn the task of finding a thousand jewels, and sets a deadline 99 hours hence, which is too little time for Zorn to obtain the jewels from the kingdom of Zorna.  In addition, the Duke demands that Zorn must also find a way to restart the thirteen frozen clocks.

Zorn and the Golux travel to the home of Hagga, a woman who had been given the magical ability to weep jewels rather than tears.  She tells them that she has wept so much, in order to provide jewels for others, that she can no longer weep from sadness; the only time she weeps is when she weeps from laughing.  She adds that such jewels, produced by weeping with laughter, will turn back into tears a fortnight (fourteen days) later. Undeterred by this, the Golux and Zorn obtain a thousand of these short-lived jewels of laughter from her.  

The Prince and Golux return to the castle, with the jewels.  With the help of Saralinda, the Golux finds a way to restart the clocks as required.  Presented with the thousand jewels and the sound of the thirteen clocks striking, the Duke is forced to admit defeat. Zorn and the Princess happily depart by ship, first to the kingdom of Yarrow (where Saralinda's father lives) and then on to the Prince's homeland of Zorna.

A fortnight later, while the Duke is gloating over his jewels, they transform back into tears. The angry Duke, deprived of his vengeance and his profit, is then killed by a nightmarish monster called the Todal, sent by the Devil as punishment for failing to do sufficient evil.

Reception
Boucher and McComas praised the book as "magically adorned with touches of modern humor, hints of dark Jacobean terror, and gleams of pure poetry.".

The USA's Common Core State Standards Initiative includes The 13 Clocks as a text exemplar for second and third grades.

Stage, film and audio

The story was set to music by Mark Bucci and appeared in 1953 as the fifth episode of The Motorola Television Hour, with Basil Rathbone as the evil Duke.

It was also adapted and produced by Stephen Teeter for use in the 1960s in a production in Berkeley, California.  Later it was adapted and produced by Frank Lowe for stage, and published in 1976 by Samuel French, Inc .

In 1968, Warner Bros. hired producer Mervyn LeRoy to make a film of The 13 Clocks, and the Sherman Brothers wrote a score. The project was cancelled; the score was released on the Unsung Sherman Brothers CD.

Audio recordings have also been produced, performed by Lauren Bacall (Pathways of Sound, POS 1039 & 1040), Peter Ustinov (Caedmon Audio) and Edward Woodward (Phoenix Audio). The BBC produced a radio version of the story in December 1973, with Heron Carvic as the Golux and Nigel Lambert as Prince Zorn.

A three part Jackanory adaptation was broadcast on BBC One 28–30 December 1983 starring Colin Jeavons as the Duke, Roy Kinnear as the Golux, Yolande Palfrey as Saralinda and Simon Shepherd as Prince Zorn.

Christopher Theofanidis wrote an opera based on the story in 2002.

Visual artist Juan Delcán created a short animated film of the opening chapter of the book, with narration by Neil Gaiman.

References

External links
 "The Motorola Television Hour", 1953
 The 13 Clocks, Juan Delcan, 2011

1950 American novels
1950 fantasy novels
American fantasy novels
Novels by James Thurber
Books illustrated by Marc Simont
American children's novels
Children's fantasy novels
1950 children's books